Private maritime security companies (PMSCs) are private security companies with a focus on providing maritime security. PMSCs are sometimes referred to as Private Security Companies (PSCs) or Private Military Security Companies (PMSCs), which are private land-based security companies that also offer maritime services.   

The PMSCs do most often provide their services to the commercial shipping industry who fear piracy, as modern day piracy is posing a threat to the shipping industry and all maritime transport.

The PMSCs are especially active in areas with strategically important waterways where piracy is a serious security. This is due to the fact that sea route is one of the main ways of transportation and trade with other countries. Today, the among the hotspots are the Indian Ocean, the Strait of Malacca, the Gulf of Guinea, the Gulf of Aden, and the Gulf of Mexico.

PMSCs are primarily hired to provide anti-piracy services in different parts of the world, but mostly in strategically important waterways where the incidents of piracy attacks is high. PMSCs are effective, as the International Maritime Bureau (IMB), have reported that no ship has been successfully hijacked with armed personnel on board, which is supported by IMO statistics.

The most prominent offshore employment of PMSCs is the armed protection of vessels against pirates and armed robbery.

Currently, shipping accounts for the transport of over 80% of goods globally, why the international trade relies heavily on the movement of goods through shipping. Maritime security threats such as piracy and robbery can disrupt the movement of vessels and their cargo including the economies of states.

The presence of the PMSCs points to a global system where non-state actors play significant roles in international affairs.

Emergence 
The contemporary services the private security companies offer were in the past largely seen as the responsibility of government agencies. Some of the services the PMSCs offer are in addition to security provided by states and their government agencies.  

The number of companies that offer protection with armed guards and other security services for commercial shippers who fear pirate attacks has risen sharply in the first decade of the 21st century in certain areas of the world. Especially since 2008 many new companies have been formed and many existing PSCs have refocused on maritime security. The rising number of incidents of piracy attacks and attempts has therefore led to the emergence of various private stakeholders in the field of maritime security offering anti-piracy services.      

SAMI is a membership organisation which represents maritime security companies and acts as a focal point for global maritime security matters. In 2011 the International Chamber of Shipping (ICS) offered its public support for the use of private armed security aboard ships. IMO represent about 80% of the world’s merchant fleet.

Services 
The most prominent offshore employment of PMSCs is the armed protection of vessels against pirates. This kind of armed protection and anti-piracy services at sea are mostly minor operations and do only require the presence of the hired security personnel for short periods of time. Five to ten guards are most often enough to protect a ship against pirates as they normally operate in smaller groups.

The PMSCs are increasingly offering their services to safeguard commercial shipping interests.  

The contemporary private maritime security market offer a wide selection of services, for example:   

 Operational and tactical military and maritime security training
 Security intelligence analysis and risk advisory services and assessments
 Rapid emergency response
 Hijack and hostage negotiations
 Armed and unarmed operational support. The operational support exits of anti-piracy operations, fisheries protection, coast guard duties, logistics support. Note that armed guards are not allowed in some states (e.g. in Nigeria and Sierra Leone).
 Armed and unarmed site security. For example at ports, offshore platforms or cruise vessels.

The PMSCs are most often hired by the commercial shipping industry, ship-owners, insurance companies, private luxury yachts, cruise liners, or port operators. Governments does sometimes also hire PMSCs. Cruiseliner and large passenger ferries are often discreetly using the services provided by the PMSCs. 

The PMSCs' are operating with a desire to ensure that the provision of their security services remains profitable.

Controversy 
The demand for private maritime services is not a modern phenomenon but has received global attention. There are differing views whether the engagement of private security undermines the security and sovereignty of individual states as the use of force traditionally is viewed as an act requiring prerogative of the state. Moreover, there have been concerns and controversies about the types of anti-piracy services. Some responses of the PMSCs are problematic as they represent legal, ethical, economic, and political problems.

There are arguments concluding that the PSCs work for the individual ship owners, but not as a long-term solution to the threat of maritime piracy unless the PSCs are using in a coordinated way. Other arguments build on view that PSCs and PMSCs, from a business and monetary perspective are interested in the continuation of their operations.

A critique of the use of private security companies build on the thoughts of the potential case of the armed security guards killing e.g. pirates or sailors.  

The lack of interaction with public authorities determines the consequences of privatising security and complicate the engagement of PMSCs. In Southeast Asia the PMSCs only cooperate with government agencies at a local level.

Legal and policy issues 
The PMSCs are engaged in providing anti-piracy measures with a transnational and institutionalized nature. The engagement at sea and the focus on protecting vessels against the threat of piracy and armed robbery results in legal challenges. The PMSCs are increasingly sanctioned by their flag states. However, coastal states hesitate to allow PMSCs that engage in potentially violent actions within their territory. 

The provision of lethal force by private companies on the sea and in international water seems to be more complicated than actions on land. 

Legal and regulatory frameworks remain in many areas uncertain even though attempts of legitimizing PMSCs forces have been done. The PMSCs do also engage in shaping the development of rules in the maritime security framework due to their involvement in anti-piracy services.

The PMSCs need to comply with the laws and regulations set by the states in the areas that they provide their services. This can be difficult and complex as the vessels move between different states and jurisdictions. Sometimes the right of innocent passage are invoked.  

A complex legal environment currently governs PMSC engagement as the increased use of PMSCs to protect commercial shipping from pirate attacks has triggered legal reform at various levels. This can be viewed at from three levels: international, national and industry self-regulation. The current legal framework governing maritime security in international law (with a focus on piracy and armed robbery against ships) is found in the following conventions: United Nations Convention on the Law of the Sea (UNCLOS), the Convention for the Suppression of Unlawful Acts against the Safety of Maritime Navigation (SUA) and its Protocol. It is also found in the International Convention for the Safety of Life at Sea (SOLAS) (chapters V, and XI-2). These conventions are relevant to PMSCs as they concerns the privatization of security. Moreover, the UN Firearms Protocol is relevant to include as the use of firearms for vessel protection is a crucial and controversial aspect of PMSCs and their services. In addition to these Conventions, the IMO has issued multiple guidelines complementing the international security framework and has adopted three sets of interim recommendations.

See also 
 Security company
 Piracy
 Piracy in the 21st century

References 

Security companies